Interaction is an album by Art Farmer's Quartet featuring guitarist Jim Hall. It was  recorded in 1963 and originally released on the Atlantic label.

Track listing
 "Days of Wine and Roses" (Henry Mancini, Johnny Mercer) - 6:49     
 "By Myself" (Howard Dietz, Arthur Schwartz) - 7:11     
 "My Little Suede Shoes" (Charlie Parker) - 5:02     
 "Embraceable You" (George Gershwin, Ira Gershwin) - 7:02     
 "My Kinda Love" (Louis Alter, Jo Trent) - 7:14     
 "Sometime Ago" (Sergio Mihanovich) - 6:26

Personnel
Art Farmer - flugelhorn
Jim Hall - guitar
Steve Swallow - bass
Walter Perkins - drums

References 

Atlantic Records albums
Art Farmer albums
Jim Hall (musician) albums
1963 albums
Albums produced by Nesuhi Ertegun